Delta-1-catenin and Delta-2-catenin are members of a subfamily of proteins with ten Armadillo-repeats. Delta-2-catenin is expressed in the brain where it is important for normal cognitive development. Like beta-catenin and gamma-catenin, delta-catenins seem to interact with Presenilins. These catenin-presenilin interaction have implications for cadherin function and regulation of cell-to-cell adhesion.

While beta-catenin acts as a transcription regulatory protein in the Wnt/TCF pathway, delta-catenin 1 has been implicated as a regulator of the NF-κB transcription factor.

Palmitoylation of delta-catenin seems to coordinate activity-dependent changes in synaptic adhesion molecules, synapse structure, and receptor localizations that are involved in memory formation.

References

See also
Catenin
CTNND1

Catenins
Armadillo-repeat-containing proteins